Delphinium elatum is a species of flowering plant in the buttercup family Ranunculaceae, known by the common name alpine delphinium or candle larkspur. It produces spikes of blue or purple flowers in summer.

Taxonomy
Delphinium elatum was one of the many species described by Carl Linnaeus in his 1753 work Species Plantarum.

Cultivation
All plants must be securely staked to avoid the flower heads collapsing. Gloves should be worn when handling the plant, as it can cause severe discomfort if accidentally ingested.

Delphinium elatum is a source of many ornamental cultivars in a range of colours from blue and purple to pink, cream, and white.

Cultivar series include Magic Fountains, Pacific giant, Dwarf Pacific, New Millennium, and Aurora (six varieties: Blue, Deep Purple, Lavender, Light Blue, Light Purple and White).

The following cultivars have received the Royal Horticultural Society's Award of Garden Merit:
'Lord Butler'  
'Sungleam' 
'Sweethearts' (New Millennium Series)

Chemical
Seven C19-norditerpenoid alkaloids can be isolated from Delphinium elatum: N-formyl-4,19-secopacinine, iminoisodelpheline, iminodelpheline, iminopaciline, 6-dehydroeladine, elpacidine, and melpheline.

References

Further reading

External links
Naturegate: Delphinium elatum

elatum
Garden plants
Plants described in 1753
Taxa named by Carl Linnaeus